Steve Meredith (born 26 August 1985 in Samoa) is a former professional Samoan rugby league player, who last played with the Windsor Wolves in the NSW Cup.

Career
Meredith played in the Sydney Roosters Jersey Flegg Grand final winning team in 2002. He was selected for the Australian Schoolboys Team in 2003 and the NSW u/19 State Of Origin team in 2004.

Meredith played in the Sydney Roosters Premier League grand final winning team in 2004 and also
played in 2005 Premier League Grand final for the club. In 2005, Meredith made his test debut for Samoa against Tonga.  In round 6 of the 2006 NRL season, he made his NRL debut for the Sydney Roosters against Brisbane.  He suffered a season ending knee injury of the match which the club lost 24–6.

In 2008, he played for Newtown in their NSW Cup grand final loss to Wentworthville. The match is the longest in rugby league history with the game going over 100 minutes.

It was announced on Penrith's official website forum on 2 January 2009 that Meredith had signed to play with the Windsor Wolves for that season and would also train for three months with the Penrith team.

References

External links
Sydney Roosters profile

1985 births
Samoan rugby league players
Sydney Roosters players
Newtown Jets NSW Cup players
Windsor Wolves players
Rugby league props
Samoan emigrants to Australia
Living people